Toward the Within (1994) is the first official live album of Brendan Perry and Lisa Gerrard's group Dead Can Dance. It contains 15 songs, of which only four appeared on their previous albums, and two of which were later re-recorded and included on Lisa Gerrard's first solo album, The Mirror Pool.  The others previously existed only in live performances and unofficial bootlegs, but were not officially released until Toward the Within. Along with Perry and Gerrard were a number of musicians who had performed with them on other occasions.

Overview 
Toward the Within was recorded in one take in November 1993 at the Mayfair Theatre in Santa Monica, California and was released by 4AD as an album and a video (VHS and LaserDisc) a year later. It was the last major event to take place in the Mayfair Theatre before it was severely damaged in the Northridge earthquake in January 1994 and had to be closed indefinitely. The video was filmed by producer Mark Magidson, known for his work on the 1992 film Baraka. It contains interviews with Gerrard and Perry, as well as a music video for "Yulunga (Spirit Dance)", composed of clips from Baraka.

While the CD functions as the soundtrack to the video, neither contain the entire show. The CD lacks "Gloridean" as well as the song played over the ending credits of the video, while the video lacks "Persian Love Song" and concert footage of "Yulunga (Spirit Dance)".

In 2001, Toward the Within was re-released on DVD and included in the box set Dead Can Dance (1981-1998). In addition to the original content, the DVD release contained a few extras: a discography; music videos for "Frontier", "The Protagonist" and "The Carnival Is Over"; and a chapter from Baraka titled "Calcutta Foragers/Homeless", which is set to Dead Can Dance's "The Host of Seraphim". In 2004, the DVD was released in a stand-alone package.

Performers 
List of musicians who performed in the Toward the Within live concert.
 Brendan Perry (voice, percussion, guitar, tin whistle, yangqin)
 Lisa Gerrard (voice, yangqin, percussion)
 Lance Hogan (guitar)
 Andrew Claxton (keyboard, percussion)
 John Bonnar (keyboard, percussion)
 Rónán Ó Snodaigh (percussion)
 Robert Perry (percussion, flute, low D whistle, guitar)

Track listing 

Songs composed by Lisa Gerrard and Brendan Perry, except as noted

Note: "Persian Love Song" is based on an ancient Persian song, later re-recorded by Lisa Gerrard and released in 1995 on her solo album The Mirror Pool. The same song was used by David Sylvian as an introduction to "Nostalgia" (from the Brilliant Trees album), a 20-second sample from the song "The Silver Gun" taken from Persian Love Song & Mystic Chants, an album released in 1971 by Shusha Guppy, although Sylvian did not specify that in the album credits.
"I Am Stretched on Your Grave" is based on an anonymous 17th century poem. Sinéad O'Connor performed the song in a traditional style over a hip hop drum beat on her 1990 album I Do Not Want What I Haven't Got.

References

External links
 
Details of "Toward The Within" Laserdisc on LDDb.com

Dead Can Dance albums
1994 live albums
2004 live albums
2004 video albums
Live video albums
4AD live albums
4AD video albums
Warner Records live albums
Warner Records video albums